

The Pitcairn PA-19 was a four-seat autogyro developed in the United States in the early 1930s. While most of Pitcairn's autogyro designs featured open cockpits in tandem, the PA-19 had a fully enclosed cabin. It also had wings that carried control surfaces. The rotor provided lift only, but could be tilted in flight to trim the aircraft. Four examples were built before the effects of the Great Depression forced Pitcairn to abandon autogyro production in 1934.

Henry Latham Doherty purchased one to promote his "Florida Year-Round Clubs", while the Guinness Brewery purchased two.  Colonel Robert L. Montgomery purchased one to commute between his homes, and Pitcairn Aviation kept one as a demonstrator.

Specifications

References
Notes

Bibliography
 
 
 
 

1930s United States civil utility aircraft
PA-19
Single-engined tractor autogyros
Aircraft first flown in 1932